Calvin Jerome Murphy (born May 9, 1948) is an American former professional basketball player who after a prolific collegiate career at Niagara, where he averaged 33.1 points per game over his three years, played in the National Basketball Association as a guard for the San Diego/Houston Rockets from 1970 to 1983. He is a currently a member of the Houston Rockets' AT&T SportsNet TV broadcast team.

Early years
Before basketball, Calvin Murphy was a world-class baton twirler. He says he was "bullied into it" as his mother and all six of her sisters were twirlers. As an 8th grader, in 1963, he won a national championship in baton twirling.  His reputation as a twirler earned him invitations to perform at major sporting events and the 1964 New York World's Fair. In 1977, at the height of his basketball career in Houston, Murphy won the Texas State Men's Twirling Championship.

He played basketball for Norwalk High School, where he was All-State three times and All-America twice. He is a member of the Connecticut Coaches Association Hall of Fame and a Connecticut Sportswriters Gold Key Award winner. Norwalk High School's address is now 23 Calvin Murphy Rd. in his honor.

College (1967–1970)
Murphy attended Niagara University, where he was a three-time All-American. He scored 2,548 points in 77 games (33.1 points per game).

One of his best games was a 68-point outing against Syracuse University at Niagara's Gallagher Center. In 1970, he led Niagara to the NCAA tournament and advanced to the second round, where they lost to Villanova. During his career he was famous for being one of "The Three M's", along with Pete Maravich and Rick Mount, both of whom were NCAA Men's Division I Basketball All-Americans at the same time as Murphy.

Murphy is a member of the Alpha Nu Omega chapter of the Iota Phi Theta fraternity, being initiated alongside fellow future Hall of Famer Elvin Hayes.

NBA (1970–1983)
Murphy was drafted by the San Diego Rockets (now the Houston Rockets) as the first pick in the second round (18th overall) of the 1970 NBA draft. In his first season, after averaging 15.8 points and 4 assists per game, Murphy was nominated to the NBA All-Rookie team. During the 1975 NBA Playoffs, Murphy averaged a postseason career-high of 24.4 points and 5.6 assists per game, as the Rockets advanced past the New York Knicks in the first round (Houston was in the Eastern Conference at the time), before being eliminated by the Boston Celtics in the semifinals. Two seasons later, on March 18, 1978, Murphy set a career high with 57 points scored during a 106–104 loss to the New Jersey Nets. The following year, he earned his only All-Star selection.

During the 1980-81 NBA season, Murphy played a key role in the Rockets making it to the NBA Finals. That postseason run, on April 17, 1981, Murphy led the Rockets to a decisive Western Conference Semifinals Game 7 win over the San Antonio Spurs with 42 points, a postseason career high. After advancing past the Kansas City Kings in the conference finals, in the 1981 NBA Finals Murphy and the Rockets lost  to the Boston Celtics in a six-game series. Murphy retired in 1983.

Murphy was one of the best free-throw shooters in league history, setting NBA records for most consecutive free throws made and for the highest free throw percentage in a single season (1980–1981), though both records have since been broken. He set many other records within the Rockets organization, including that of all-time leading scorer until that record was broken in 1994 by Hakeem Olajuwon. Despite being among the shortest players in the league, Murphy was considered to be an "enforcer" due to his physical playing style and willingness to confront other players for hard fouls. Murphy was inducted into the Basketball Hall of Fame in 1993.

Post-NBA life
After retirement, Murphy continued to work for the Rockets organization in numerous roles, mainly as television analyst for Rockets games. He is currently the halftime and post-game analyst for local Rockets broadcasts on AT&T SportsNet.

In 2004, he faced trial in Houston for sexually abusing five of his daughters. He was acquitted of these charges in December of that year.

He hosted The Calvin Murphy Show on ESPN Radio's Houston affiliate from 2007 until its cancellation in January 2010.

Statistics and accomplishments
Inducted to the Naismith Basketball Hall of Fame in 1993
Jersey #23 retired by the Houston Rockets
Second highest Free Throw Percentage in a Season – 206 of 215 (95.8%) in 1980–81
NBA Consecutive Free Throws Made – 3rd, 78 (December 27, 1980 – February 28, 1981) 
NBA All-Rookie Team: 1971
NBA All-Star Team: 1979
Games played; 1,002
Career points: 17,949 (17.9 points per game)
Career steals: 1,165
Career assists: 4,402 (4.4 apg)
Career high points: 57 (against New Jersey Nets- March 18, 1978)
Career playoff high: 42 (against San Antonio Spurs- April 17, 1981)
1000-point seasons: 11

NBA career statistics

Regular season 

|-
| style="text-align:left;"| 
| style="text-align:left;"|San Diego
| 82 || – || 24.6 || .458 || – || .820 || 3.0 || 4.0 || – || – || 15.8
|-
| style="text-align:left;"| 
| style="text-align:left;"|Houston
| 82 || – || 31.0 || .455 || – || .890 || 3.1 || 4.8 || – || – || 18.2
|-
| style="text-align:left;"| 
| style="text-align:left;"|Houston
| 77 || – || 22.0 || .465 || – || .888 || 1.9 || 3.4 || – || – || 13.0
|-
| style="text-align:left;"| 
| style="text-align:left;"|Houston
| 81 || – || 36.1 || .522 || – || .868 || 2.3 || 7.4 || 1.9 || .0 || 20.4
|-
| style="text-align:left;"| 
| style="text-align:left;"|Houston
| 78 || – || 32.2 || .484 || – || .883 || 2.2 || 4.9 || 1.6 || .1 || 18.7
|-
| style="text-align:left;"| 
| style="text-align:left;"|Houston
| 82 || – || 36.5 || .493 || – || .907 || 2.5 || 7.3 || 1.8 || .1 || 21.0
|-
| style="text-align:left;"| 
| style="text-align:left;"|Houston
| 82 || – || 33.7 || .490 || – || .886 || 2.1 || 4.7 || 1.8 || .1 || 17.9
|-
| style="text-align:left;"| 
| style="text-align:left;"|Houston
| 76 || – || 38.2 || .491 || – || .918 || 2.2 || 3.4 || 1.5 || .0 || 25.6
|-
| style="text-align:left;"| 
| style="text-align:left;"|Houston
| 82 || – || 35.9 || .496 || – || .928 || 2.1 || 4.3 || 1.4 || .1 || 20.2
|-
| style="text-align:left;"| 
| style="text-align:left;"|Houston
| 76 || – || 35.2 || .493 || .040 || .897 || 2.0 || 3.9 || 1.9 || .1 || 20.0
|-
| style="text-align:left;"| 
| style="text-align:left;"|Houston
| 76 || – || 26.5 || .492 || .235 ||style="background:#cfecec;"|.958*|| 1.1 || 2.9 || 1.5 || .1 || 16.7
|-
| style="text-align:left;"| 
| style="text-align:left;"|Houston
| 64 || 0 || 18.8 || .427 || .063 || .909 || 1.0 || 2.5 || .7 || .0 || 10.2
|-
| style="text-align:left;"| 
| style="text-align:left;"|Houston
| 64 || 0 || 22.2 || .447 || .286 || .920 || 1.2 || 2.5 || .9 || .1 || 12.8
|- class="sortbottom"
| style="text-align:center;" colspan="2"| Career
| 1,002 || – || 30.5 || .482 || .139 || .892 || 2.1 || 4.4 || 1.5 || .1 || 17.9
|- class="sortbottom"
| style="text-align:center;" colspan="2"| All-Star
| 1 || 0 || 15.0 || .600 || – || – || 1.0 || 5.0 || 2.0 || .0 || 6.0

Playoffs 

|-
|style="text-align:left;"|1975
|style="text-align:left;”|Houston
|8||–||38.1||.462||–||.895||2.4||5.6||1.8||.1||24.4
|-
|style="text-align:left;"|1977
|style="text-align:left;”|Houston
|12||–||35.0||.479||–||.933||1.6||6.3||1.6||.2||19.3
|-
|style="text-align:left;"|1979
|style="text-align:left;”|Houston
|2||–||36.5||.290||–||.889||1.5||3.0||4.0||.5||13.0
|-
|style="text-align:left;"|1980
|style="text-align:left;”|Houston
|7||–||37.9||.537||.500||1.000||1.4||3.7||1.6||.0||18.7
|-
|style="text-align:left;"|1981
|style="text-align:left;”|Houston
|19||–||28.4||.495||.286||.967||1.3||3.0||1.4||.0||18.1
|-
|style="text-align:left;"|1982
|style="text-align:left;”|Houston
|3||–||19.0||.227||.000||.875||1.0||1.3||.3||.0||5.7
|- class="sortbottom"
| style="text-align:center;" colspan="2"| Career
| 51 || – || 32.5 || .475 || .286 || .932 || 1.5 || 4.2 || 1.5 || .1 || 18.5

See also
List of shortest players in National Basketball Association history
List of National Basketball Association players with 9 or more steals in a game
List of NCAA Division I men's basketball players with 60 or more points in a game

References

External links 
 NBA.com: Calvin Murphy Bio – Murphy's NBA bio
 Video of Calvin Murphy demonstrating how baton twirling helps with basketball

1948 births
Living people
African-American basketball players
All-American college men's basketball players
American men's basketball players
Basketball players from Connecticut
Houston Rockets assistant coaches
Houston Rockets players
Naismith Memorial Basketball Hall of Fame inductees
National Basketball Association All-Stars
National Basketball Association broadcasters
National Basketball Association players with retired numbers
National Collegiate Basketball Hall of Fame inductees
Niagara Purple Eagles men's basketball players
Norwalk High School (Connecticut) alumni
Parade High School All-Americans (boys' basketball)
Point guards
San Diego Rockets draft picks
San Diego Rockets players
Shooting guards
Sportspeople from Norwalk, Connecticut
21st-century African-American people
20th-century African-American sportspeople